South Korea, IOC designation:Korea, participated in the 2007 Asian Winter Games held in Changchun, China, from 28 January to 4 February 2007.

Medal summary

Medal table

Medalists

Gold
Curling
 Men – Lee Je-ho, Beak Jong-chul, Yang Se-young, Kwon Young-il, Park Kwon-il
 Women – Jeong Jin-sook, Kim Ji-suk, Park Mi-hee, Lee Hye-in, Ju Yun-hoa

Short track speed skating
 Men's 1000 m – Ahn Hyun-soo
 Men's 5000 m relay – Ahn Hyun-soo, Kim Byung-joon, Kim Hyun-gon, Lee Ho-suk, Song Kyung-taek
 Women's 1000 m – Jin Sun-yu
 Women's 1500 m – Jung Eun-ju

Speed skating
 Men's 500 m – Lee Kang-seok
 Men's 1000 m – Lee Kyou-hyuk
 Men's 1500 m – Lee Kyou-hyuk

Silver
Alpine skiing
 Men's slalom – Gang Min-hyeok
 Men's giant slalom – Gang Min-hyeok
 Women's giant slalom – Oh Jae-eun

Short track speed skating
 Men's 500 m – Song Kyung-taek
 Men's 1000 m – Kim Hyun-gon
 Men's 1500 m – Ahn Hyun-soo
 Women's 1500 m – Jin Sun-yu
 Women's 3000 m relay – Byun Chun-sa, Jeon Ji-soo, Jin Sun-yu, Jung Eun-ju, Kim Min-jung

Speed skating
 Men's 500 m – Lee Kyou-hyuk
 Men's 1000 m – Mun Jun
 Men's 5000 m – Yeo Sang-yeop
 Women's 500 m – Lee Sang-hwa
 Women's 1500 m – Lee Ju-yeon

Bronze
Alpine skiing
 Men's giant slalom – Kim Woo-sung
 Women's slalom – Oh Jae-eun
 Women's giant slalom – Kim Sun-joo

Ice hockey
 Men – Choi Jung-sik, Hong Hyun-mook, Hwang Byung-wook, Jeon Jin-ho, Kim Han-sung, Kim Hong-il, Kim Ki-sung, Kim Kyung-tae, Kim Kyu-heon, Kim Yoon-hwan, Lee Kwon-jae, Lee Kwon-jun, Lee Myung-woo, Lee Yong-jun, Oh Hyun-ho, Park Joon-won, Park Sung-min, Park Woo-sang, Seo Sin-il, Son Ho-sung, Um Hyun-seung, Yoon Kyung-won

Short track speed skating
 Women's 500 m – Byun Chun-sa
 Women's 1000 m – Jung Eun-ju

Speed skating
 Men's 100 m – Lee Kang-seok
 Men's 1000 m – Choi Jae-bong
 Men's 1500 m – Mun Jun
 Women's 100 m – Lee Sang-hwa
 Women's 1000 m – Kim Yoo-rim

Participation details

Alpine skiing

Men

Women

Curling

Ice hockey

Short track speed skating

Men

Women

Speed skating

Men

Women

References

Nations at the 2007 Asian Winter Games
Asian Winter Games
South Korea at the Asian Winter Games